The following is a list of amusement parks in Europe sorted by region.

Austria
 Hirschalm, Unterweißenbach, Upper Austria (Hirschalm Fairytale Hunting Park)
 Märchenpark Neusiedlersee, St. Margarethen, Burgenland (Neusiedlersee Family Park)
 Wiener Prater, Vienna (Wiener Prater amusement park)

Carinthia
 1. Kärntner Erlebnispark, Hermagor

Salzburg
 Erlebnispark Strasswalchen, Strasswalchen
 Wild & Freizeitpark Ferleiten, Ferleiten

Styria
 Freizeitzentrum Stubenberg, Stubenberg
 Wild und Erlebnispark, Mautern in Steiermark

Tyrol
 Familienland Erlebnispark, Sankt Jakob in Haus
 Freizeitzentrum Zahmer Kaiser, Walchsee
 Spielpark Leutasch, Leutasch
 Witches' Water, Söll

Azerbaijan

Qabala Rayon
 Qabaland, Qabala

Belarus

Minsk
 Chelyuskinites Park
 Gorky Park
 Dreamland

Belgium

Brussels
 Océade, Bruparck, Brussels (closed in 2018)

Flanders
 Bellewaerde (aka: Safari Bellewaerde, Toeristisch Centrum Bellewaerde), Ypres
 Bobbejaanland, Lichtaart
 Boudewijn Seapark (aka: Dolfinarium Brugge, Boudewijnpark), Bruges
 Circus Bruul, Geel
 Plopsa Indoor Hasselt, Hasselt
 Plopsaland (aka: Meli Park), Adinkerke, De Panne
 Plopsaqua De Panne, Adinkerke, De Panne
 Plopsa Station, Antwerp
 ZoetWaterPark (aka: Zoete Waters), Oud-Heverlee, Flemish Brabant

Wallonia
 Euro Space Center, Transinne, province of Luxembourg
 Plopsa Coo (aka: TéléCoo), Stavelot, province of Liège
 Walibi Belgium (former Six Flags), Wavre, Walloon Brabant

Croatia
 , Funtana
 Glavani Park, Barban, Pula
 Fun Park Biograd, Biograd

Cyprus
 Pafos Luna Park, Geroskipou, Paphos
 Parko Paliatso, Ayia Napa, Famagusta
 Sparti Rope Park, Platres, Limassol

Czech Republic
 Aquapalace Prague
 Dinopark, Plzeň, Prague, Liberec, Vyškov, Ostrava
 Prague Lunapark, Prague

Denmark

Bornholm
 Joboland, Svaneke

Jutland
 Djurs Sommerland, Nimtofte
 Fårup Sommerland, Saltum
 Karolinelund, Aalborg (closed in 2010)
 Legoland Billund, Billund
 Rømø Lege- & Hesteland, Rømø
 Tivoli Friheden, Århus
 Universe, Nordborg
 Varde Sommerland, Varde  (closed in 2002)

Sjælland
 BonBon-Land, Holme-Olstrup
 Dyrehavsbakken, Klampenborg
 Marielyst Familiepark & Aqualand, Marielyst
 Sommerpark, Græsted (closed in 2009)
 Sommerland Sjælland, Nykøbing
 Tivoli Gardens, Copenhagen

Finland
 Mariepark, Mariehamn, Åland
 Nokkakivi, Lievestuore, Laukaa, Central Finland
 PowerPark, Alahärmä, Kauhava, South Ostrobothnia
 Puuhamaa, Tervakoski, Janakkala, Tavastia Proper
 Visulahti, Mikkeli, South Savonia
 Wasalandia, Vaasa, Ostrobothnia (Closed in 2015)

Uusimaa
 Linnanmäki, Helsinki
 Planet FunFun (aka: Fanfaari), Kerava

Kymenlaakso
 Tykkimäki, Kouvola

Western Finland
 Moomin World, Naantali, Southwest Finland
 Särkänniemi (aka: Neula's amusement), Tampere, Pirkanmaa

France
 Europark, Vias, Occitanie
 Futuroscope, Poitiers, Poitou-Charentes
 Napoleonland, Montereau-Fault-Yonne
 Nigloland, Dolancourt, Champagne-Ardenne
 OK Corral, Cuges-les-Pins

Alsace
 Cigoland, Kintzheim
 Didi'Land (aka: Fantasialand), Morsbronn-les-Bains

Aquitaine
 Kid Parc, Gujan Mestras
 Walibi Aquitaine, Rocquefort

Auvergne
 Le Pal, Dompierre Sur Bresbe
 Parc Fenestre, La Bourboule
 Vulcania, Saint-Ours-les-Roches

Brittany
 Cobac Parc, Lanhélin
 La Récré des 3 Curés, Milizac

Burgundy
 Florida Parc, Brochon
 Parc Récréatif de la Toison d'or, Dijon
 Parc Touristique des Combes, Le Creusot
 Touro Parc, Romanèche-Thorins

Ile-de-France
 Fami Parc, Nonville
 France Miniature, Élancourt
 Jardin d'Acclimatation, Paris
 Mirapolis, Cergy-Pontoise

Marne-la-Vallée
 Disneyland Paris (opened as Euro Disney Resort)
Disneyland Park (opened as Euro Disneyland)
Walt Disney Studios Park

Lorraine
 Fraispertuis City, Jeanménil
 Walygator Parc (aka: Walibi Lorraine, Walibi Schtroumpf, Big Bang Schtroumpf), Maizières-les-Metz

Lower Normandy
 Festyland, Bretteville-Sur-Odon
 Parc Festyland, Caen

Upper Normandy
 Parc du Bocasse, Bocasse

Midi-Pyrénées
 Cité de l'espace, Toulouse

Nord-Pas de Calais
 Bagatelle, Merlimont
 Dennlys Parc, Dennebroeucq
 Parc de Lomme, Lomme

Pays de la Loire
 Holly Park, Échemiré
 Papea City, Le Mans
 Puy du Fou, Les Epesses

Picardy
 Mer de Sable, Ermenonville
 Parc Astérix, Plailly
 Parc Saint Paul, Saint-Paul

Provence-Alpes-Côte d'Azur
 Antibes Land, Antibes
 Azur Park, St. Tropez
 Koaland, Menton
 Lunapark Fréjus, Fréjus
 Magic Park Land (aka: El Dorado City), Ensuès-la-Redonne
 Magic World, Hyères
 OK Corral, Cuges-les-Pins
 Zygo Park (aka: Zygofolis), Nice

Rhône-Alpes
 Aérocity Parc, Aubenas
 Walibi Rhône-Alpes (aka: Avenir Land), Les Avenières

Germany
 Gulliver-Welt, Saarbrücken, Saarland
Spree-Park, Berlin

Baden-Württemberg
 Auto & Technik Museum Sinsheim, Sinsheim
 Erlebnispark Tripsdrill, Cleebronn
 Europa-Park, Rust
 Familien Park, Villingen-Schwenningen
 Funny-World, Kappel-Grafenhausen
Ravensburger Spieleland, Meckenbeuren
 Schwaben Park, Kaisersbach
 Steinwasen Park, Oberried
Tatzmania, Löffingen
 Trampoline, Heilbronn
 Traumland auf der Bärenhöhle, Sonnenbühl

Bavaria
 Bayern Park, Reisbach
 Churpfalzpark, Loifling
Erlebnispark Schloss Thurn, Heroldsbach
 Fränkisches Wunderland, Plech
 Freizeit-Land Geiselwind, Geiselwind
Freizeitpark Ruhpolding, Ruhpolding
 Freizeit- und Miniaturpark Allgäu, Weitnau
 Legoland Deutschland, Günzburg
 Märchen Erlebnispark Marquartstein, Marquartstein
 Märchenwald im Isartal, Wolfratshausen
 Playmobil FunPark, Zirndorf
Rodel- und Freizeitparadies St. Englmar, Sankt Englmar
 Skyline Park, Bad Wörishofen
 Sport+Freizeitzentrum Hohenbogen, Neukirchen beim Heiligen Blut

Brandenburg 

 Karls Erlebnis-Dorf Elstal, Wustermark

Hessen
 Erlebnispark Steinau, Steinau an der Straße
 Erlebnispark Ziegenhagen, Witzenhausen
 Freizeitpark Lochmühle, Wehrheim
 Rodelparadies Wasserkuppe, Gersfeld
 Salzberger ErlebnisPark, Neuenstein
 Taunus Wunderland, Schlangenbad
 Wild-und Freizeitpark Willingen, Willingen
 Zoo Frankfurt, Frankfurt

Lower Saxony
 Erse-Park, Uetze
 Heide Park, Soltau
 Jaderpark, Jade
 Magic Park Verden, Verden
 Nordsee Spielstadt Wangerland, Hohenkirchen
 Rasti-Land, Salzhemmendorf
 Serengeti Safaripark, Hodenhagen
 Tier-und Freizeitpark Thüle, Friesoythe
 Wildpark Schwarze Berge, Rosengarten

Mecklenburg-Vorpommern
 Rügen Park, Gingst

North Rhine-Westphalia
 Affen-und Vogelpark, Reichshof Eckenhagen
 Fort Fun Abenteuerland, Bestwig
 Freizeitanlage Start und Ziel, Herne
 Freizeitzentrum SchiederSee, Delbrück
 Hollywood & Safaripark Stukenbrock, Stukenbrock
 Panorama Park, Kirchhundem
 Phantasialand, Brühl
 Potts Park, Minden
 Spielerei Rheda-Wiedenbrück, Rheda-Wiedenbrück
 Tierpark Nadermann, Schöning
Wunderland Kalkar

Bottrop
 Movie Park Germany (aka: Warner Bros. Movie World Germany, Bavaria Filmpark Bottrop, Neue Traumland, TraumlandPark, Kirchhellener Märchenwald)
 Schloss Beck, Bottrop
Köln
 Kölner Tivoli
 Tobiland

Rhineland-Palatinate
 Eifelpark, Gondorf
 FreizeitPark Bell, Bell
 Holiday Park, Haßloch
 Wild-und Freizeitpark Klotten/Cochem, Klotten

Saxony
 Belantis, Leipzig
 Freizeitpark Plohn (aka: Erlebnispark Forellenhof Plohn), Lengenfeld
 Sonnenlandpark, Lichtenau
 Kulturinsel Einsiedel, Zentendorf bei Görlitz

Saxony-Anhalt
 Erlebnistierpark Memleben, Memleben
 Erlebniswelt Seilbahnen Thale, Thale

Schleswig-Holstein
 Hansa Park (aka: Hansaland, Legoland Sierksdorf), Sierksdorf
 Tolk Schau, Tolk

Thuringia
 Märchenwald Saalburg, Saalburg

Greece

Athens
 Allou Fun Park
 Ta Aidonakia Luna Park

Chania
 Water Park Limnoupolis

Thessaloniki
 Magic Park
 Waterland

Hungary

Debrecen
 Debrecen Zoo and Amusement Park, Debrecen

Ireland
 Clara Lara FunPark, County Wicklow
 Emerald Park, Ashbourne, County Meath 
 Fort Lucan, Lucan, Fingal
 Funderland (travelling theme park)
 Funtasia, Bettystown, County Meath
 Tramore Amusement Park, Tramore, County Waterford

Italy
 Safari Park, Pombia, Piedmont

Apulia
 Felifonte, Castellaneta
 Zoosafari Fasanolandia, Fasano
 Miragica, Molfetta

Campania

Province of Naples
 Edenlandia, Naples
 Magic World, Giugliano in Campania

Emilia-Romagna
 Fiabilandia, Rimini
 Mirabilandia, Ravenna
 Italia in miniatura, Rimini

Lazio

Rome
 Luneur
 Oasi Park
 Rainbow Magicland
 Zoomarine
 Cinecittà World

Lombardy
 AdventureLand Borno, Borno
 Cowboyland, Voghera
 Europark Idroscalo Milano (aka: Luna Euro Park), Segrate
 Greenland, Limbiate
 Minigolf Adventure, Milano
 Leolandia, Capriate San Gervasio
 Prehistoric Park, Rivolta d'Adda
 Volandia, Somma Lombardo

Tuscany
Cavallino Matto, Castagneto Carducci, Tuscany

Veneto
 Carosello Park, Sottomarina
 Gardaland, Castelnuovo del Garda
 Movieland Studios (aka: Movie Studios Park), Lazise
 Playplace, Verona

Liechtenstein
 Minigolf-Sportanlag, Schaan/Vaduz

Lithuania
 JSC UNO Parks
 UNO Parks, Vilnius, Kaunas, Šiauliai, Druskininkai

Luxembourg
 Parc Merveilleux, Bettembourg

Malta
 Playmobil FunPark, Ħal Far
 Popeye Village, Mellieħa
 Splash and Fun, Bahar Ic-Caghaq

Netherlands

Drenthe
  Drouwen
 Park Oikos, Ruinen
 Plopsa Indoor Coevorden, Coevorden
 Rijk der Kabouters en Laven, Eext
 Sprookjeshof, Zuidlaren
 Verkeerspark Assen, Assen

Flevoland
 Walibi Holland, Biddinghuizen

Friesland
 Duinen Zathe, Appelscha
 Kameleondorp, Terhorne (Terherne)

Gelderland
 Amusementspark Tivoli, Berg en Dal
 Het Land van Jan Klaassen, Braamt
 Koningin Juliana Toren, Apeldoorn

Groningen
 Familiepark Nienoord, Leek, Groningen
 Wonderwereld, Ter Apel

Limburg
 Attractiepark Toverland, Sevenum
 De Valkenier, Valkenburg aan de Geul
 Sprookjesbos Valkenburg, Valkenburg aan de Geul
 Kinderstad Heerlen, Heerlen

North Brabant
 Efteling, Kaatsheuvel
 Mini Efteling, Nieuwkuijk
 Speelland, Hilvarenbeek
 DippieDoe, Best

North Holland
 Amsterdam Dungeon, Amsterdam
 Oud Valkeveen, Naarden
, Enkhuizen

Overijssel
 Attractiepark Slagharen, Slagharen
 Avonturenpark Hellendoorn, Hellendoorn
 De Waarbeek, Hengelo

South Holland
 , Rijswijk
 Duinrell, Wassenaar
 Madurodam, The Hague
 Speelstad Rotterdam, Rotterdam

Zeeland
 Deltapark Neeltje Jans, vrouwenpolder
 Mini Mundi, Middelburg

Norway
 Bø Sommarland, Bø, Telemark
 Hunderfossen Familiepark, Lillehammer, Oppland
 Kongeparken, Ålgård, Rogaland
 Kristiansand Zoo and Amusement Park, Kristiansand, Vest-Agder
 TusenFryd, Oslo

Poland

Lesser Poland 

 Energylandia, Zator
 Inwałd Park, Inwałd
 Rabkoland, Rabka-Zdrój
 Zatorland, Zator

Lubusz Land 

 Holiday Park, Kownaty
 Majaland Kownaty, Torzym

Łódź Province 

 Mandoria Miasto Przygód, Rzgów

Mazovia 
 Park of Poland, Wręcza
 Farma Iluzji, Trojanów

Pomerania 

 Lunapark Krynica, Krynica Morska
 Lunapark Sowiński, Władysławowo
 Kaszubski Park Miniatur, Strysza Buda

Western Pomerania 

 Pomerania Fun Park, Dygowo

Silesia 

 Esplanada, Szklarska Poręba
 Legendia (aka: Silesian Amusement Park), Chorzów
 Ogrodzieniec Park, Ogrodzieniec

Portugal
 Aqualand, Alcantarilha
 , Quarteira
 Naturwaterpark, Vila Real
 Norpark, Nazaré, Portugal
 Parque Aquático de Amarante, Amarante, Portugal
 Parque Aquático no Complexo Desportivo do Príncipe Perfeito, Viseu
 Portugal dos Pequenitos, Coimbra, Centro
 Scorpio, Guimarães
 Slide & Splash, Lagoa, Algarve
, Albufeira

Romania
 Parc Aventura Brasov, Brasov
 Arsenal Park Transilvania, Orăștie
 Luna Parc, Pitești
 Orǎṣelul Copiilor, Bucharest
 Satul de Vacanţǎ, Mamaia
 Alex & Emma's Land, Pietroșani

Russia
 Beoland, Nizhny Novgorod
 Rivyera, Kazan

Krasnodar Krai
 Admiral Vrungel, Gelendzhik
 Krasnodar Park, Krasnodar
 Sochi Park, Sochi

Moscow
 Attractionmania
 Gorky Park
 Sokolniki Park
 Star Galaxy Adventure
 VDNKh
 Dream Island

Saint Petersburg
 Gagarin Park
 Park Alisa
 Park Yulya
 Wonder Island

Slovakia
 DinoPark, Bratislava, Kosice
 Tatrapolis Svet Miniatúr, Liptovský Mikuláš

Slovenia
 Adventure Park Postojna, Postojna

Spain

Andalusia
 Isla Mágica, Seville
 Tivoli World, Benalmádena

Aragon
 Dinópolis, Teruel
 Parque de Atracciones de Zaragoza, Zaragoza

Basque Country
 Parque de Atracciones Monte Igueldo, San Sebastián

Castile-La Mancha
Puy du Fou España, Toledo, Spain

Catalonia
 Ferrari Land, Salou
 PortAventura Park, Salou and Vilaseca
 Tibidabo Amusement Park, Barcelona

Community of Madrid
 Parque de Atracciones de Madrid, Madrid
 Parque Warner Madrid, San Martín de la Vega

Navarre
 Sendaviva, Arguedas

Valencian Community
 DinoPark Algar, Callosa d'en Sarrià
 Pola Park, Santa Pola
 Terra Mítica, Benidorm

Sweden
 Astrid Lindgren's World, Vimmerby
 Furuviksparken, Gävle
 Gröna Lund, Stockholm
 High Chaparral Theme Park, Värnamo
 Kneippbyn, Gotland
 Kolmården Wildlife Park, Kolmården
 Liseberg, Gothenburg
 Öland Zoo, Färjestaden (Öland)
 Parken Zoo, Eskilstuna
 Skara Sommarland, Skara
 Santaworld, Mora
 Tosselilla Summer Park, Tomelilla

Switzerland
 Connyland, Lipperswil
 Jungfrau Park, Interlaken
 Swiss Vapeur Parc, Le Bouveret

Turkey
 Vialand, Istanbul
 Masal Park, Osmaniye
 Mazakaland, Kayseri
 Parkantep Harikalar Diyarı, Gaziantep
 Wonderland Eurasia, Ankara
Land of Legends, Antalya

Ukraine
 Ancient Kyiv, Principality of Kyivan Rus, Kyivan region, village Kopachiv

United Kingdom

See also
List of amusement parks
List of water parks in Europe

Europe
Amusement parks
Amusement parks